Mad Dog Mcrea are a British folk band from Plymouth, Devon, England, their music blends a mixture of folk rock, pop, gypsy jazz and bluegrass.

In 2011 Mad Dog released their album The Whirling Dervish, and this won the band Best Album of the Year at the South West Music Awards 2011.

BBC Radio 2's Mike Harding heard the band sometime in 2011 and got in touch with Mad Dog to ask them to send over CDs, since then he has played them several times on the BBC. He is quoted as saying "one of the most exciting discoveries of 2011" notwithstanding the fact that the band have three albums under their belt and many years of performance behind them.

The band are mates of Seth Lakeman and entertained fellow musicians, friends and guests at his wedding celebrations in 2012

In addition to their usual local and national gigs, the official Mad Dog 'Happy Bus' tour of the UK took place in November 2012 and featured friend Cosmo Jarvis in support (who penned Waiting on the Hill from The Whirling Dervish).

One career highlight for the band was performing The Rocky Road to Dublin with Mick Jagger on tambourine at a charity garden party for The Prince's Trust

In 2013, Mad Dog Mcrea also performed on the Avalon Stage as part of the 2013 Glastonbury Festival

Discography

References

External links
Official Mad Dog Mcrea Website

British folk rock groups
Celtic music groups
Gypsy jazz musicians